The fourth annual edition of the Champs-Élysées Film Festival was held from 10 to 16 June 2015.

See also

References

External links 
 
 
 

Champs-Élysées Film Festival
2015 film festivals
2015 festivals in Europe
2015 in Paris
2015 in French cinema